The 1947 Butler Bulldogs football team was an American football team that represented Butler University as a member of the Mid-American Conference (MAC) during the 1947 college football season. In its tenth season under head coach Tony Hinkle, the team compiled a 5–3–1 record (1–3 against MAC opponents) and finished in third place in the MAC. The team played its home games at the Butler Bowl in Indianapolis.

Schedule

References

Butler
Butler Bulldogs football seasons
Butler Bulldogs football